Pizzo di Gino is a mountain of Lombardy, Italy. With an elevation of 2,245 m it is the highest peak of the Lugano Prealps.

SOIUSA classification 
According to the SOIUSA (International Standardized Mountain Subdivision of the Alps) the mountain can be classified in the following way:
 main part = Western Alps
 major sector = North Western Alps
 section = Lugano Prealps
 subsection = Prealpi Comasche
 supergroup = Catena Gino-Camoghè-Fiorina
 group = Gruppo del Gino
 code = I/B-11.I-A.1

Access to the summit

The easiest route for the summit starts from San Nazzaro Val Cavargna and passes by a mountain hut called Rifugio Croce di Campo (1,739  m).

Notes

External links
Pizzo di Gino on Hikr

Mountains of Lombardy
Two-thousanders of Italy
Mountains of the Alps
Lugano Prealps